The 2019 Singapore Cup (also known as the Komoco Motors Singapore Cup for sponsorship reasons) is the 22nd edition of the Singapore Cup, Singapore's annual premier club football knock-out tournament organised by the Football Association of Singapore.

The draw was held on 30 August 2019.  The groups are as follows:

Format

Competition
The Singapore Cup will commence on September 25, 2019 with a group phase of two groups with four teams each. The teams will compete in the single-round group stage. The top two teams advance to the semifinals with the group winners facing the runner-up team from the other group. The higher seeded teams will host the one-off semifinals. The final will consist of a single match as well.

Groups

Group A

Group B

Semi-finals

Bracket

The first legs will be played on 26 October 2019, and the second legs will be played on 30 October 2019.

|}

Tampines Rovers won 4-1 on aggregate.

Warriors FC won 4-2 on penalty after 5-5 aggregate.

3rd / 4th

Final

Season statistics

Top scorers

References

Singapore Cup seasons
Singapore
2019 in Singaporean football